Digama strabonis is a moth of the  family Erebidae, subfamily Arctiinae. It is found in Kenya, South Africa, and Zimbabwe.

External links
 Species info

Aganainae
Moths described in 1910